Wilson Kipkemei Busienei (born 18 August 1981 in Nakasongola) is a Ugandan long-distance runner. He is best known for winning three gold medals at the 2005 Summer Universiade. He has represented his country at the World Championship level in cross country running and road running and on the track. He took part in the 2004 Summer Olympics, finishing eleventh in the 10,000 metres. Busienei has also competed at the Commonwealth Games, having taken fifth in the 10,000 m in 2006.

He ran at the 2010 Giro al Sas 10,000 m race in Italy in October and crossed the line after Edwin Soi to finish as runner-up.

International competitions

Personal bests
3000 metres – 7:46.62 min (2006)
5000 metres – 13:11.08 min (2006)
10,000 metres – 27:21.55 min (2006)
Half marathon – 1:01:39 hrs (2005)

References

External links

1981 births
Living people
Ugandan male long-distance runners
Olympic athletes of Uganda
Athletes (track and field) at the 2004 Summer Olympics
Commonwealth Games competitors for Uganda
Athletes (track and field) at the 2006 Commonwealth Games
World Athletics Championships athletes for Uganda
Universiade medalists in athletics (track and field)
Universiade medalists for Uganda
Medalists at the 2005 Summer Universiade
20th-century Ugandan people
21st-century Ugandan people